Anthony 'Babyface' Nelson (born 9 November 1985) is a British former professional boxer who competed from 2012 to 2018. He held multiple regional titles including the Northern Area super flyweight title in 2013, the English super flyweight title in 2014, and the Commonwealth super flyweight title from 2015 to 2016.

Professional boxing record 

{|class="wikitable" style="text-align:center; font-size:95%"
|-
!
!Result
!Record
!Opponent
!Type
!Round, time
!Date
!Location
!Notes
|-
|14
|Loss
|12-2
|align=left| Charlie Edwards
|KO
|3 (10)
|16 Jun 2018
|align=left| 
|align=left|
|-
|13
|Win
|12-1
|align=left| Simas Volosinas
|PTS
|6
|28 Apr 2018
|align=left| 
|
|-
|12
|Loss
|11-1
|align=left| Jamie Conlan
|KO
|8 (12)
|30 Apr 2016
|align=left| 
|align=left|
|-
|11
|Win
|11-0
|align=left| Ian Halsall
|PTS
|6
|18 Sep 2015
|align=left| 
|
|-
|10
|Win
|10-0
|align=left| Jamie Wilson
|RTD
|6 (12)
|4 Apr 2015
|align=left| 
|align=left|
|-
|9
|Win
|9-0
|align=left| Terry Broadbent
|UD
|10
|12 Oct 2014
|align=left| 
|align=left|
|-
|8
|Win
|8-0
|align=left| Usman Ahmed	
|PTS
|4
|7 Dec 2013
|align=left| 
|
|-
|7
|Win
|7-0
|align=left| Mohammed Waqas
|PTS
|10
|7 Jul 2013
|align=left| 
|align=left|
|-
|6
|Win
|6-0
|align=left| Ryan McNicol
|PTS
|4
|19 Apr 2013
|align=left| 
|
|-
|5
|Win
|5-0
|align=left| Francis Croes	
|PTS
|6
|15 Feb 2013
|align=left| 
|
|-
|4
|Win
|4-0
|align=left| Anwar Alfadli
|PTS
|4
|24 Nov 2012
|align=left| 
|
|-
|3
|Win
|3-0
|align=left| Delroy Spencer
|PTS
|4
|9 Sep 2012
|align=left| 
|
|-
|2
|Win
|2-0
|align=left| James Ancliff
|TKO
|2 (4)
|15 Jul 2012
|align=left| 
|
|-
|1
|Win
|1-0
|align=left| Jonathan Fry
|PTS
|4
|20 May 2012
|align=left| 
|

References

External links

1985 births
English male boxers
Living people
Sportspeople from South Shields
Super-flyweight boxers